The Alameda Dr Carlos d'Assumpção is a street at the Southern end of the Macau peninsula with Dr Carlos d'Assumpção Park in between both directional double-lanes. It is one of the busier streets on Macau's NAPE district, built upon reclaimed sealand.

Naming 
The street Alameda Dr Carlos d'Assumpção was named after Dr Carlos d'Assumpção, late Chairman of the Macau Legislative Assembly and a member of the Fundação Oriente's Consultive Committee.

Major buildings 
Amongst other offices and institutes, the Macau government tourist office as well as the Institute for Social and Cultural Research of the Macau University of Science and Technology are located at the Alameda Dr Carlos d'Assumpção.

At the southern end of the street, the bronze statue of Kun Iam is erected at the waterfront promenade.

See also
 List of roads in Macau

References

Roads in Macau